The Pakistan cricket team toured Bangladesh from 15 April to 10 May 2015. The tour consisted of a 50-over tour match between Pakistan and a Bangladesh Cricket Board XI, two Test matches, three One Day Internationals and one Twenty20 International.

Bangladesh won the ODI series 3–0, its first ever series win against Pakistan, and also won the sole Twenty20 International played. Pakistan won the Test series 1–0.

Squads
Sohaib Maqsood withdrew from the tour due to a hand injury on 7 April; he was replaced by the uncapped Saad Nasim. Sohail Khan withdrew due to a back injury on 11 April; he was replaced in the ODI squad by Junaid Khan, who was already part of the T20I and Test squads. His replacement in the Test squad was Imran Khan. Yasir Shah withdrew from the tour due to a hand injury on 16 April; he was replaced in the ODI squad by Zulfiqar Babar. Ehsan Adil withdrew from the ODI squad on 18 April and was replaced by Umar Gul. Bangladesh announced their T20I squad on 22 April, which included the uncapped players Litton Das and Mustafizur Rahman. Bangladesh announced their squad for the Test series on 24 April. Pakistan's Rahat Ali was ruled out of the Test series due to a hamstring injury. Bangladesh fast bowler Rubel Hossain was ruled out of the second Test with a side strain and was replaced by Abul Hasan.

50-over tour match

ODI series

1st ODI

2nd ODI

3rd ODI

T20I series

Test series

1st Test

2nd Test

Broadcasters
Bangladesh Television and PTV Sports were the official broadcasters of this series respectively in Bangladesh and Pakistan.

References

External links
 Series Home on ESPN Cricinfo
 Pakistan vs Bangladesh on Cricket.com.pk

2014 in Bangladeshi cricket
2014 in Pakistani cricket
International cricket competitions in 2014–15
Bangladeshi cricket seasons from 2000–01
Pakistani cricket tours of Bangladesh